Bobby Goldsmith (8 March 1946 – 18 June 1984) was one of Australia's early victims of acquired immune deficiency syndrome (AIDS). Goldsmith was an Australian athlete and active gay community member who won 17 medals in swimming at the first Gay Olympics, in San Francisco in 1982.

Goldsmith was assisted by a network of friends who organised care for him, allowing him to live independently during his illness, until his death on Monday 18 June 1984. From this network emerged the Bobby Goldsmith Foundation, which is Australia's oldest HIV/AIDS charity.

See also

HIV/AIDS in Australia

References

External links
Bobby Goldsmith Foundation

1946 births
1984 deaths
AIDS-related deaths in Australia
Australian male swimmers
Australian gay men
Gay sportsmen
LGBT swimmers
Australian LGBT sportspeople
20th-century Australian LGBT people